The Centrelink Master Program, or more commonly known as Centrelink, is a Services Australia master program of the Australian Government. It delivers a range of government payments and services for retirees, the unemployed, families, carers, parents, people with disabilities, Indigenous Australians, students, apprentices and people from diverse cultural and linguistic backgrounds, and provides services at times of major change. The majority of Centrelink's services are the disbursement of social security payments.

History and operations
Centrelink commenced initially as a government agency of the Department of Social Security under the trading name of the Commonwealth Services Delivery Agency in early 1997. Following the passage of the Commonwealth Services Delivery Agency Act 1997, the Centrelink brand name came into effect in late 1997. Offices were established nationally to manage services to people in need of social security payments.

In 2016 Concentrix, a business services company and subsidiary of U.S.-based SYNNEX Corporation, was one of the companies awarded a contract to operate call centres for Centrelink.

Another company awarded a call centre operating contract by Centrelink is Stellar, a subsidiary of the Nevada-registered U.S. company Stellar LLC.

Following the re-election of the Morrison Federal Government in May 2019, the Department of Human Services was renamed Services Australia.

Automated debt recovery controversy

In 2016, Centrelink began reconciling welfare recipients' records against data from the Australian Taxation Office. In a process that had previously seen 20,000 debt recovery letters issued per year, this new automated data-matching technique, with less human oversight, saw that number increase to 169,000 letters during July-Dec 2016. Opponents of the automated process - known colloquially as 'robo-debt' - say that errors in the system have led to welfare recipients paying nonexistent debts or debts that are larger than what they actually owe. Some welfare recipients have been required to make payments while contesting their debts.

In some cases, the debts being pursued dated back further than the Australian Taxation Office requests that Australians retain their documentation.  The onus was moved from Centrelink needing to verify the information, to being on the individual to prove they did not owe the funds, with human interaction being very limited in the dispatch of the debt letters.

The process, however, was touted to save the government $300m, and as such was considered for recovery action against the Aged Pension and Disability Pension, which could have recovered .

The program was the subject of a Senate committee inquiry.

Appearing before the Senate committee inquiry, the department was asked how many people had become deceased after receiving a letter under the debt recovery program. After the question was taken on notice, the department was asked again in a subsequent inquiry hearing, and it was again taken on notice.

The 2018 Australian federal budget indicated that the data matching scheme would be expanded further.

The calculations used to estimate debt are being legally challenged by Legal Aid Victoria, who say that they assume that people are working regular, full-time hours when calculating income.

In September 2019 Gordon Legal announced their intention of filing a class action suit challenging the legal foundations of the 'robo-debt' system.

Scrapped 
On 29 May 2020, Stuart Robert, Minister for Government Services announced that the 'robo-debt' debt recovery scheme was to be scrapped by the Government, with 470,000 wrongly-issued debts to be repaid in full. The total sum of the repayments is estimated to be . Opposition Government Services spokesperson Bill Shorten criticised the Government's lack of apology for the scheme, citing the psychological harm to many of those issued with debt recovery notices.

See also
 Social security in Australia
 Job Network

References

External links
 
 Human Services (Centrelink) Act 1997

Defunct Commonwealth Government agencies of Australia
Welfare in Australia
Public policy in Australia
Australia
Welfare agencies